is an arcade-style combat flight simulation video game developed and published by Bandai Namco Entertainment for the PlayStation 4 and Xbox One. The first new entry in the Ace Combat series since 2014 Ace Combat Infinity, it was released on consoles in January 2019, and for Windows the following month.

The game's plot marks the series' return to its traditional setting of Strangereal, and follows the exploits of "Trigger", a fighter pilot who is assigned to a penal squadron following a false accusation of murder, in the midst of a war between the countries of Osea and Erusea. The game features support for virtual reality, offering a set of missions developed for the PlayStation VR headset, as well as several downloadable content packs offering new missions and content.

Ace Combat 7 received generally positive reviews across all platforms. It became the highest-selling entry in the series, with over 4 million units sold as of 2022, surpassing 2001's Ace Combat 04: Shattered Skies.

Gameplay
Like the rest of the Ace Combat series, Ace Combat 7: Skies Unknown forgoes a realistic flight model in favor of faster, arcade-like gameplay to increase its accessibility to newer players. The player can also choose Novice or Expert control settings; the latter enables the player to execute realistic aircraft maneuvers such as rolls and high-g turns. The game features 28 different aircraft, with an additional nine as downloadable content and the F-4E Phantom II offered as a pre-order bonus. As with previous entries in the series, most of the aircraft are licensed from the real-world, although a set of fictional superplanes are also included. Several aircraft in the game make their series debut such as various members of the Su-30 family as well as upgraded versions of older aircraft like the Gripen E and A-10C Thunderbolt II.

Players earn an in-game currency, "Military Result Points," via gameplay to purchase additional aircraft and equipment through a tech tree. The player begins the game with the F-16C, and is able to unlock the MiG-21 and F-104C Starfighter after the fourth single-player mission without using MRP, with the F-22A Raptor, Su-57, and the fictional X-02S Strike Wyvern as top-tier aircraft in the tech tree. Each aircraft is equipped with standard missiles for both air-to-air and air-to-ground warfare, as well as another special weapon. Special weapons are used to boost an aircraft's ability to carry out air-to-air or air-to-ground attacks. Equipment purchased may also be used to boost the performance of the aircraft beyond its base performance, such as improved engine parts or airframe parts to enhance its speed and survivability respectively. Only eight upgrades may be applied at any time, weight limitations limit the number of a specific type of upgrade that can be applied (e.g. limit to number of simultaneous applicable airframe parts) and certain upgrades are only usable in multi-player modes.

For the first time in the series, clouds interfere with aircraft, hindering the player's vision and targeting systems when passing through them, also rendering laser weapons ineffective due to light refraction. In addition, aircraft briefly stall after staying in a cloud for too long and lightning strikes temporarily disrupt controls and sensors. Each aircraft also carries a limited supply of flares that can be deployed to evade missiles in critical situations.

During the single-player campaign, players complete a series of combat missions that tell the in-game story. Players are given an in-game briefing prior to a combat mission, where they are informed of success parameters, expected opposition, terrain features and weather conditions using a 3D map display. Players complete missions by destroying various air and surface targets, as well as accomplishing specific mission targets (e.g. destroying in-flight IRBMs). AI-controlled wingmen accompany the player through the mission, providing exposition and potentially shooting down enemy planes for the player. Over the course of the single-player campaign, the player may choose to engage in additional minigames, such as in-flight refueling or landing on an aircraft carrier. These minigames can be skipped, but confer additional points to players.

Multiplayer
The player may choose to play in the multiplayer mode regardless of any progress made in the single-player campaign. The multi-player mode comprises the Team Deathmatch and Battle Royale modes. Both modes are PvP, where players shoot down enemy aircraft to earn points against a timer. The two modes differ in that Team Deathmatch involves two teams of four players each whereas Battle Royale is a free-for-all mode. Shooting down top-scoring and players using expensive aircraft confers more points than shooting down worse-performing or lower-tier players. After a player's aircraft has been destroyed, they are respawned in the map after a few seconds. When the time limit is reached, the team or player with the greatest score is declared the winner.

Synopsis

Setting
Ace Combat 7 is set in the series' fictional universe of Strangereal, where Earth has entirely different nations, geography, and history. The game's story details the 2019 Lighthouse War, fought between the Osean Federation and the Kingdom of Erusea in the continent of Usea. Following the Continental War, Osea brokered a peace treaty between the Federal Republic of Erusea and the rest of the Usean continent, while the International Union (IUN) formed the IUN Peace Keeping Force (IUN-PKF) to maintain peace across the Usean continent. In 2011, Erusea was restored to its historical status as a kingdom ruled by the D'Elise royal family. That same year, former Osean president Vincent Harling ordered the construction of the International Space Elevator (ISEV), a space elevator and communications tower used to convert atmospheric energy into usable energy for Usea, off the coast of western Usea near Erusea. The ISEV is protected by two massive Osean airborne aircraft carrier drones known as Arsenal Birds named Liberty and Justice, carrying a large number of combat drones, advanced weaponry, and force fields, and receiving their power via microwave transmission from the ISEV. Though Harling intended for the ISEV to be a symbol of lasting peace, Erusea viewed it as a symbol of Osean imperialism that infringed on Erusean sovereignty, with these resentments ultimately sparking the Lighthouse War.

Players control the game's silent protagonist, Osean fighter pilot "Trigger". The game's frame story is told through prerendered cutscenes played between missions, primarily from the point of view of three characters: Avril Mead, an Osean civilian aircraft mechanic who broke wartime aviation laws and is forced to work in an Osean penal military unit; Rosa Cossette D'Elise, the princess and heir of Erusea who believes the war will end Osean interference on the continent; and Dr. Schroeder, a Belkan scientist who developed advanced combat drone technology for the Erusean military.

Plot
Rising tensions between Osea and Erusea culminate when Erusea launches a surprise attack on Osea with a massive number of combat drones. Erusea captures much of the Usean continent, including the ISEV and both Arsenal Birds, with former Osean president Vincent Harling still in the ISEV. Consequently, war breaks out between Erusea and Osea, the latter supported by the IUN-PKF. Avril, who was flying a refurbished F-104C Starfighter when the war began, is shot down in the crossfire, arrested for breaching wartime aviation laws, and is transferred as a mechanic to the Osean 444th Air Base, a military prison disguised as an air base, home to the penal fighter squadron "Spare Squadron".

Trigger, part of an Osean IUN-PKF squadron based in eastern Usea, fights to repel Erusean forces, but the IUN-PKF suffers heavy losses to the Arsenal Bird Liberty and Erusean ace Mihaly A. Shilage, who provides flight data to the Erusean combat drone program headed by Dr. Schroeder. Trigger leads a mission to extract Harling from the ISEV, but an Osean missile strikes Harling's rescue aircraft, killing him. Trigger is accused of firing the missile, found guilty by court-martial, and transferred to Spare Squadron. Considered expendable, Spare Squadron is sent on highly dangerous missions with minimal support to probe Erusea's drone defense network for weak points, frequently losing members in the process. Trigger encounters Mihaly again and dogfights him to a standstill, impressing Mihaly before both are forced to retreat due to inclement weather.

For their commendable performance, all members of Spare Squadron are pardoned and transferred to a base on Tyler Island, off the southwestern coast of Usea, while Trigger and his wingman Count are recruited by the elite Long Range Strategic Strike Group (LRSSG). Assisted by the LRSSG, Osea and the IUN-PKF mount a series of devastating counter-offensives, including the destruction of Liberty using the sole operational Stonehenge railgun, allowing them to retake most of Usea. Meanwhile, Princess Rosa Cossette D'Elise, who initially promoted anti-Osean sentiment, becomes disillusioned with the war.

Osea launches an assault on the Erusean capital of Farbanti. Trigger encounters Mihaly again, but their duel is interrupted when Osea and Erusea use anti-satellite weapons against each other, causing a collisional cascade that breaks down satellite communication networks worldwide and disables both sides' IFF signals. As Mihaly escapes in the confusion, Erusea loses control over its AI-controlled drone fleet and collapses into a civil war between conservative and radical factions seeking to end and prolong the war respectively, while multiple Erusean states declare independence, including Mihaly's native Shilage, of which he is the heir. With the network down, Dr. Schroeder travels to the ISEV to transmit Mihaly's flight data into a new generation of Erusean combat drones, manufactured in automated drone factories across Usea, while the LRSSG, now cut off from command and forced to operate independently, attempts to gather information and end the war. The LRSSG attempts to extract an Erusean conservative informant, who reveals that Harling was killed by an Erusean drone that spoofed Osean IFF signals, but he is accidentally killed by Osean forces who misidentify his extraction aircraft due to IFF failures.

Meanwhile, Avril and the 444th try to survive on an isolated Tyler Island—now the site of a chaotic three-way battle between Osea, Erusea, and rogue Osean penal units—and find Cossette, whose liaison aircraft was shot down by Erusean radicals. Avril and Cossette, assisted by the LRSSG, evacuate both friendly military units and civilian refugees from the island and head to the ISEV to seek aid; en route, Cossette realizes that Harling had peaceful intentions with the ISEV and that the Erusean radicals lied to her to spark the war. The LRSSG is forced to raid Shilage to replenish their supplies, but Mihaly arrives to stop them. Trigger duels and defeats Mihaly, who apologizes for his involvement in the drone program and asks Trigger to end the drone threat before his aircraft crashes, leaving him unable to fly for the rest of his life.

Schroeder and Avril's group both arrive at the ISEV and confront each other, and one of Mihaly's granddaughters destroys Mihaly's flight data before it can be uploaded. Schroeder reveals he sought revenge for the loss of his country by forcing the nations that defeated them into needless conflicts, using his own drone program and Mihaly's combat data to create a force capable of crushing Osea. Disillusioned by the destruction his program had caused, Schroeder agrees to help stop the factories, but reveals that the data was already uploaded to two advanced drones, "Hugin" and "Munin".

A joint Osean and Erusean coalition assaults the ISEV to seize it from Erusean radicals, while Rosa and Avril disable its microwave power transmissions, allowing Trigger to destroy the remaining Arsenal Bird Justice. However, Hugin and Munin arrive and repel the coalition, intending to complete the data transmission and prolong the war. The next morning, Trigger leads a counterattack on the ISEV and shoots down one of the drones, but the other, having acquired data from Trigger’s fighting style, escapes into an undersea tunnel that takes it deep below the ISEV. Trigger and Count pursue the drone and destroy it and the signal repeaters to prevent the transmission, ending the war. In the aftermath, peace returns to Usea, and Cossette, who has become the leader of Erusea's newly-formed provisional government, leads the post-war peace movement in Harling's memory.

In the DLC missions, set between an attack on Erusean missile bases and the Battle of Farbanti, the LRSSG is assigned to capture the Alicorn, a massive Erusean submarine aircraft carrier armed with a railgun, and Captain Matias Torres, a mentally-unstable ultranationalist who commands the Alicorn's cult-like crew and specifically despises Trigger. After failing to capture the submarine at an Erusean port, and defeating a pair of mercenaries who attempt to assassinate Trigger, the LRSSG learns that the Alicorn has defected from the Erusean Navy and that Torres plans to attack the Osean capital of Oured with a smuggled nuclear artillery shell, intending to kill "one million lives" to force an end to the Lighthouse War. After using sonobuoys and a magnetic anomaly detector to locate the Alicorn, the LRSSG and Osean anti-submarine planes force it to surface and engage it in a protracted battle, eventually destroying the Alicorn and killing Torres, ending their threat to Osea.

VR Mode's plot follows Ace Combat 04: Shattered Skies protagonist Mobius 1 as he joins the IUN-PKF to battle the Free Erusea terrorist group in 2014, five years prior to the events of the main game. This storyline occurs separately from the main plot.

Development
Despite lackluster reviews, Ace Combat Infinity for the PlayStation 3 was a surprise hit for veteran fans, and commercial interest in the series by Bandai Namco was renewed, prompting internal development team Project Aces to develop a true sequel, the first mainline Ace Combat game since 2007's Ace Combat 6: Fires of Liberation for the Xbox 360.

Ace Combat 7 was the first in the series to use Unreal Engine 4, resulting from the original Ace Combat engine being in "a state of limbo" and the successes of the Tekken 7 development team in using Unreal Engine 4. "trueSky", an Unreal Engine plugin that generates realistic clouds, played a notable role in the game's development, being one of the first additions to the game.

Ace Combat 7's development process used "sandaibanashi", a rakugo storytelling technique using three subjects; for Ace Combat 7, the subjects Project Aces used were "space elevator", "princess", and "three-dimensional cloud". A teaser trailer shown at PlayStation Experience 2015, a very early impression of the game created before development properly began, prominently featured all three subjects. Ace Combat series producer Kazutoki Kono told the development team the elements of the teaser had to appear in the game, and declined a suggestion that the teaser simply be a "product impression". The game was developed by Project Aces and Bandai Namco Studios Singapore, which used a "Western style" of development and organization compared to Project Aces' "Japanese style", resulting in a cultural gap that both teams had to overcome. Development was assisted by the Japan Air Self-Defense Force and the Japan Maritime Self-Defense Force, who offered technical advisors and aircraft information.

A significant amount of work went into the game's virtual reality mode, exclusive to PlayStation VR. Initially, the entire campaign was intended to be VR-compatible, and all of the game's cutscenes were created with VR compatibility to the point of audio post-production; however, they were canceled because of framerate issues with the PlayStation 4 and the difficulties in making VR missions, which were created separately from campaign missions. Ultimately, only three VR missions were added to the game, following a storyline separate to the main campaign; three more missions were planned but were not released. Much work also went into the game's sound effects and music, with the game's soundtrack by series composer Keiki Kobayashi.

Two-player local multiplayer was rumored to have been included, but was not added; in the final game, only online multiplayer exists. Development of the online multiplayer mode was designed to provide the same experience regardless of platform, location, or skill level, and playtesting was conducted overseas.

Release 
Originally set to be released in 2017, the game's release was eventually delayed to 2018, before finally being released for the PlayStation 4 and Xbox One on January 18, 2019, and for Windows on February 1. Preorders for the game came with digital copies of Ace Combat 5: The Unsung War for the PlayStation 4, and Ace Combat 6: Fires of Liberation on the Xbox One.

Ace Combat 7 features post-release downloadable content that adds new aircraft, missions, roundels, squadron markings, and paint schemes. On May 26, 2022, a DLC adding content from Top Gun: Maverick, which was released the following day, was released.

Reception

Ace Combat 7 received "generally favorable reviews", according to review aggregator Metacritic.

Famitsu magazine gave Ace Combat 7 a rating of 35/40, the highest of those reviewed in issue 1571. Eurogamer's John Linneman recommended the game as a return to form of the Ace Combat series, and praised its gameplay, graphics, music, plot, and VR mode, deeming it an "absolute must-play". Forbes contributor Ollie Barder gave the game a 9/10, saying "while it can be a demanding game at times, it is definitely a rewarding one", though he lamented the limited scope of the VR compatibility and opined that the inclusion of only three VR missions did not justify buying Playstation VR.

Eurogamer.it's Antonio Savino, Game Informer's Andrew Reiner, GameSpot's Edmond Tran, and GameRevolution's Jason Faulkner each gave Ace Combat 7 a rating of 8/10. Savino highlighted the game's graphics, sound, and music, though he noted that due to a lack of a "fairly convincing blur effect", things often felt "still", even at high speeds. Reiner highlighted its gameplay, sound, and presentation, but criticized the uneventful multiplayer experience and the campaign's "preposterous" plot, calling it "a Fast and the Furious story that is trying to be touching and serious, but it just doesn’t mesh". Tran praised the game as marking the series' return to form as well as its gameplay and VR experience, but noted the campaign had "tedious" missions with sparse checkpoints. Faulkner said the game had a "great story" with excellent graphics and a replayable multiplayer mode, though he lamented the absence of features from previous titles such as wingman commands or branching campaign missions, criticized the game's design as being "a bit too safe", and noted the VR mode lacked motion sickness safeguards, making it difficult to play through, though he added that it was worth it.

IGN's Mike Epstein rated the game 7/10, approving of the graphics and overall gameplay experience, but criticizing its odd mission pacing, "convoluted" story with lengthy and unavoidable exposition, "poor communication of objectives", and "confusing controls", with his overall verdict stating that "It's enough to prove that there’s room for the [Ace Combat] series to make a comeback, though this game will be not the one to jumpstart it."

Kazutoki Kono, responding to Epstein's IGN review on Twitter, criticized him for using Normal controls, which are basic and designed for newcomers, instead of Expert controls, which are more realistic and offer more control. Barder agreed with Kono and suggested that using Normal controls "just makes the game harder"; similarly, Faulkner noted that newcomers picking Normal "could accidentally play through the whole game [...] with controls that prevent them from getting the most out of the game".

Sales 
In Japan, the game sold 202,379 copies for the PlayStation 4 during its first week, and sold 286,570 units by March 2019. In Southeast Asia, the game sold over 500,000 units within a month. In the United Kingdom, it had the highest debut sales in the series, entering the charts second overall.

By July 2020, Ace Combat 7 had sold over two million units, marking a major commercial milestone for the franchise since Ace Combat 04: Shattered Skies in 2002. , the game had sold over  units worldwide, surpassing Ace Combat 04: Shattered Skies to become the franchise's best-selling title. As of November 2022, the game has sold over 4 million units in total.

Awards

Notes

References

External links

 
 

2019 video games
Ace Combat
Bandai Namco games
Namco games
Combat flight simulators
PlayStation VR games
PlayStation 4 games
Multiplayer and single-player video games
Unreal Engine games
Video games developed in Japan
Video games set in 2019
Video games set in a fictional country
Xbox One games
Windows games